Performance FC Phoenix was an American soccer team based in Greenville, South Carolina, United States. Founded in 2007, the team played in the National Premier Soccer League (NPSL), a national amateur league at the fourth tier of the American Soccer Pyramid, for just one season, until 2008, when the franchise folded and the team left the league.

The team played its home games in the vicinity of the city of Greenville. The team's colors were black, red, and white.

History

Players

2008 Roster

Year-by-year

Head coaches
  Tom Morris (2008)

Stadia

External links
Performance FC

National Premier Soccer League teams
Soccer clubs in South Carolina
2007 establishments in South Carolina
2008 disestablishments in South Carolina
Association football clubs established in 2007
Association football clubs disestablished in 2008
Sports in Greenville, South Carolina